Valdefuentes may refer to several places in Spain:

 Valdefuentes, Cáceres, in the province of Cáceres in Extremadura
 Valdefuentes de Sangusín, in the province of Salamanca in Castile and León
 Valdefuentes del Páramo, in the province of León in Castile and León
 Valdefuentes (Madrid), a ward of Hortaleza district, Madrid